The 2011 China Open Super Series Premier was a top level badminton competition contested from November 22, 2011 to November 27, 2011 in Shanghai, China. It was the twelfth BWF Super Series competition on the 2011 BWF Super Series schedule. A total of $350,000 was given out as prize money.

Men's singles

Seeds

  Lee Chong Wei
  Chen Long
  Lin Dan
  Peter Gade
  Chen Jin
  Sho Sasaki
  Nguyen Tien Minh
  Taufik Hidayat

Finals

Top half

Bottom half

Women's singles

Seeds

  Wang Shixian
  Wang Yihan
  Wang Xin
  Saina Nehwal
  Jiang Yanjiao
  Juliane Schenk
  Tine Baun
  Cheng Shao-chieh

Finals

Top half

Bottom half

Men's doubles

Seeds

  Cai Yun / Fu Haifeng
  Jung Jae-sung / Lee Yong-dae
  Mathias Boe / Carsten Mogensen
  Ko Sung-hyun / Yoo Yeon-seong
  Koo Kien Keat / Tan Boon Heong
  Muhammad Ahsan / Bona Septano
  Chai Biao / Guo Zhendong
  Markis Kido / Hendra Setiawan

Finals

Top half

Bottom half

Women's doubles

Seeds

  Wang Xiaoli / Yu Yang
  Tian Qing / Zhao Yunlei
  Mizuki Fujii / Reika Kakiiwa
  Ha Jung-eun / Kim Min-jung
  Cheng Wen-hsing / Chien Yu-chin
  Miyuki Maeda / Satoko Suetsuna
  Shizuka Matsuo / Mami Naito
  Meiliana Jauhari / Greysia Polii

Finals

Top half

Bottom half

Mixed doubles

Seeds

  Zhang Nan / Zhao Yunlei
  Xu Chen / Ma Jin
  Joachim Fischer Nielsen / Christinna Pedersen
  Tantowi Ahmad / Lilyana Natsir
  Chen Hung-ling / Cheng Wen-hsing
  Sudket Prapakamol / Saralee Thoungthongkam
  Songphon Anugritayawon / Kunchala Voravichitchaikul
  Lee Yong-dae / Ha Jung-eun

Finals

Top half

Bottom half

References

External links
tournamentsoftware.com

Open Super Series Premier
China Open (badminton)
China Open Premier